The Wran ministry (1976–1978) or First Wran ministry was the 71st ministry of the New South Wales Government, and was led by the 35th Premier of New South Wales, Neville Wran, representing the Labor Party. It was the first of eight consecutive occasions when Wran was Premier.

Background
After  years in government, the Liberal–National Country Party coalition was narrowly defeated at the election on 1 May 1976 by the Wran–led Labor Party, with a swing to Labor of 6.82% giving Labor  a one seat majority.

Wran had been elected to the Legislative Council of New South Wales by a joint sitting of the New South Wales Parliament on 12 March 1970. He was Leader of the Opposition in the Legislative Council from 22 February 1972. He resigned from the council on 19 October 1973 to switch to the Legislative Assembly, successfully contesting the election for Bass Hill, which he would hold until his retirement in 1986. Labor, led by Pat Hills, was defeated at the 1973 election and Wran successfully challenged Hills to become Leader of Labor Party and Leader of the Opposition from 3 December 1973.

Composition of ministry
The composition of the ministry was announced by Premier Wran and sworn in on 14 May 1976. There were minor rearrangements of the ministry in August 1976 and February 1977. The ministry ended on 19 October 1978, when Wran was successful at the 1978 election and the Second Wran ministry was formed.

 
Ministers are members of the Legislative Assembly unless otherwise noted.

See also

 Members of the New South Wales Legislative Assembly, 1976–1978
Members of the New South Wales Legislative Council, 1976–1978

Notes

References

 

New South Wales ministries
1976 establishments in Australia
1978 disestablishments in Australia
Australian Labor Party ministries in New South Wales